Copestylum avidum, the yellow-spotted bromeliad fly, is a species of syrphid fly in the family Syrphidae.

References

Eristalinae
Diptera of North America
Hoverflies of North America
Articles created by Qbugbot
Insects described in 1877
Taxa named by Carl Robert Osten-Sacken